Banco Obrero Fútbol Club (usually called Banco Obrero) was a professional club. The club has won one First Division title in the amateur era. The club is based in Caracas.

Honours
Primera División Venezolana: 1
Winners (1): 1956

External links
Banco Obrero FC 

Football clubs in Venezuela
Football clubs in Caracas
Defunct football clubs in Venezuela